Michael G. Heavican (born August 4, 1947) is the chief justice of the Supreme Court of Nebraska.  He was appointed to the court on October 2, 2006, by Governor Dave Heineman.

Early life and education 
Heavican was born on August 4, 1947 in Columbus, Nebraska. 
Heavican received a Bachelor of Arts from the University of Nebraska in 1969, and received his Juris Doctor from the University of Nebraska-Lincoln School of Law in 1974.

Career
Heavican's experience prior to joining the bench was exclusively as a state and then federal prosecutor.  From 1975-1980, he was a Deputy Lancaster County Attorney. He became Chief Deputy Lancaster County Attorney in 1981, and then served as the Lancaster County Attorney from 1981-1991.  He ran for Attorney General of Nebraska in 1990, but lost the Republican primary to Don Stenberg.  In 1991, Heavican left state service to become an Assistant United States Attorney for the District of Nebraska.  After ten years with that office, he was appointed by newly elected President George W. Bush to be the United States Attorney for the District of Nebraska in 2001, a position he held until becoming Chief Justice of Nebraska.

References 

  

|-

1947 births
Living people
20th-century American lawyers
21st-century American judges
Assistant United States Attorneys
Chief Justices of the Nebraska Supreme Court
District attorneys in Nebraska
Nebraska Republicans
United States Attorneys for the District of Nebraska
University of Nebraska alumni